Eucessia is a genus of bee flies (insects in the family Bombyliidae). There is at least one described species in Eucessia, E. rubens.

References

Further reading

 

Bombyliidae genera
Articles created by Qbugbot